Víctor Manuel Torres Mestre (born 31 December 1970) is a Spanish retired footballer who played as a left back.

Playing career
Torres Mestre was born in Madrid. After unsuccessfully graduating through Real Madrid's youth ranks, only appearing in two La Liga matches in three and a half years and mainly playing with the B-squad, he was released in January 1993, only to find opportunities also scarce at fellow league club Logroñés.

In the summer of 1993, Torres Mestre signed with Espanyol, being an instant first-choice as the Catalan team won the Segunda División title and finished sixth in the following season, narrowly missing out on qualification for the UEFA Cup. He remained a starter until 1998, when he left for Bordeaux.

After one season in France, in which he was the most utilized player in his position as Bordeaux won the Division 1 championship, Torres Mestre returned to Spain, playing with Alavés and Betis, the latter in the second tier. He retired in 2006, after spells with Varzim in Portugal and with amateur sides Sporting Mahonés and Premià.

Coaching career
Torres Mestre started coaching in 2010, taking charge of Real Madrid youth sides. He started the 2011–12 campaign at the helm of Badajoz in Segunda División B, leaving his post after only 18 rounds claiming unpaid wages.

Honours
Español
Segunda División: 1993–94

Bordeaux
Division 1: 1998–99

References

External links

1970 births
Living people
Footballers from Madrid
Spanish footballers
Association football defenders
La Liga players
Segunda División players
Segunda División B players
Tercera División players
Real Madrid Castilla footballers
Real Madrid CF players
CD Logroñés footballers
RCD Espanyol footballers
Deportivo Alavés players
Real Betis players
CF Sporting Mahonés players
Ligue 1 players
FC Girondins de Bordeaux players
Primeira Liga players
Varzim S.C. players
Spain youth international footballers
Spanish expatriate footballers
Expatriate footballers in France
Expatriate footballers in Portugal
Spanish football managers
Segunda División B managers
CD Badajoz managers